Paul Clifford Hendy (born 22 July 1966) is a British script-writer, novelist, director, producer and filmmaker. In his early career, he was a TV presenter hosting the BAFTA nominated Dear Mr Barker (BBC), Don’t Try This at Home (ITV), The Disney Club (ITV), and the final series of Wheel of Fortune (ITV). He was a regular reporter on ITV’s This Morning and hosted Stash the Cash.

In 2017 Hendy wrote, produced and directed a short film The Last Laugh which sees three legendary British comedians in a dressing room discussing the secret of comedy and what it means to be funny. In 2018 Hendy produced and directed Mr Sunshine (written by Tim Whitnall), a short film on the life of Eric Morecambe.

In 2004, Hendy wrote the novel Diary of a C-List Celeb, a fictionalised account of his experiences in television and the entertainment industry. The novel was published by Bantam (Penguin Random House). In 2005, the screen rights for Diary of a C-List Celeb were optioned by Hartswood Films. In 2006, Hendy wrote the sequel, Who Killed Simon Peters? also published by Bantam (Penguin Random House).

Early career 
Hendy was born in Dawley on 22 July 1966. Hendy's career started as a member of The National Youth Theatre of Great Britain, playing the part of Billy Casper in Kes in 1980. His first break into television came when he hosted ITV's Sunday morning flagship show The Disney Club. After leaving The Disney Club, Hendy went to the BBC and hosted the Saturday morning show Parallel 9 which was broadcast live from Pinewood Studios. He has also presented Disney Summer Holidays (ITV), For Amusement Only (BBC), Highly Sprung (BBC), Travel Bug (an Action Time Production for BBC) and three series of the BAFTA nominated Dear Mr Barker (BBC).

In 2001, he took over from John Leslie as host of ITV1's game show Wheel of Fortune  with Terri Seymour and ITV1's prime time Saturday night show Don't Try This at Home with Davina McCall, which ran for four series (1998–2001). He hosted the un-aired pilot of the UK version of the game show The Chair (BBC1), which was hosted by No. 1 tennis player John McEnroe at the helm (2002).

Hendy was a regular reporter for ITV's This Morning and a guest presenter on GMTV. He hosted Talking TV (BBC1), Walk Over History (Meridian) and The Dog Listener (Channel 5). He has also hosted Kicked Into Touch (Meridian) and Stash (ITV). He also hosted a cinema review show called The Box Office Boys (BFBS), and featured on an episode of Surprising Stars with Kate Thornton.

Film 
In 2016, Hendy wrote, directed and produced the short film, The Last Laugh. The film won Best UK Film and Best UK Short at the Manchester Film Festival as well as many other International film awards including Best Comedy Drama at Los Angeles Independent Film Festival and Best Supporting Actor at Sydney Independent Film Festival.

In 2018, Hendy and his production company Evolution, optioned the film rights to Tim Whitnall’s Olivier award winning play, Morecambe. The adaptation entitled Bring Me Sunshine is due to begin principal photography in 2022.

Novels 
In 2004, Hendy wrote the novel Diary of a C-List Celeb, a fictionalised account of his experiences in television and the entertainment industry. The novel was published by Bantam (Penguin Random House).

Davina McCall called the book ‘Bloody genius, very funny and leg-crossingly embarrassing!’ and Declan Donnelly (Ant and Dec) called it ‘Very funny… and spookily close to the truth’.

In 2006, Hendy wrote the sequel, Who Killed Simon Peters? also published by Bantam (Penguin Random House).

Radio 
On radio, Hendy has hosted his own late night phone-in show, three times a week on LBC (1996). He has also presented a series of one-off specials for BFBS in which he interviewed celebrities about their all-time favourite top ten records (2001).

Evolution Productions 

In 2005, Hendy set up Evolution Productions with his wife, Emily Wood. It produces film and theatre in the UK and abroad.

Evolution's 2017/18 production of Peter Pan at The Marlowe Theatre in Canterbury was attended by over 100,000 theatre goers, a record for the venue. The British Theatre Guide called the show ‘one of the best productions in the country’.

Each year, Evolution produce 11 pantomimes around the UK with performers including: Stephen Mulhern, Duncan James, Shirley Ballas, Steve McFadden, Rita Simons, and George Takei.

Awards

Film awards

Filmography

Production

Self

Actor

References

External links 

1966 births
Living people
21st-century British novelists
British directors
British male novelists
British producers
British television presenters
National Youth Theatre members
People from Dawley
Television personalities from Shropshire